Brooks James Thompson (July 19, 1970 – June 9, 2016) was an American basketball coach and retired player, who played for the Orlando Magic, Utah Jazz, Denver Nuggets, Phoenix Suns and New York Knicks of the National Basketball Association (NBA).

College career
He was named the Colorado Player of the Year in 1989, and he led Littleton to a 24–0 record, and the state's 4A title. After high school, Thompson played college basketball at Texas A&M University. He played with the school's men's team, the Texas A&M Aggies, from 1989 to 1991. Thompson also played college basketball at Oklahoma State University, where he played with the Oklahoma State Cowboys, from 1992 to 1994.

Professional career
Thompson was selected by the NBA's the Orlando Magic, in the first round, with the 27th overall draft pick of the 1994 NBA Draft. In his NBA career, Thompson played in a total of 168 regular season games, in which he scored a total 760 points. On November 26, 1996, while a member of the Denver Nuggets, Thompson scored a career high 26 points against the Phoenix Suns. He also played professionally in the Greek Basket League, with Iraklis Thessaloniki.

Coaching career
On April 19, 2006, Thompson was named the head coach of the men's basketball team of the University of Texas at San Antonio. On November 15, 2009, UTSA defeated the University of Iowa, which was UTSA's first ever win versus a Big Ten Conference school. On March 16, 2011, Thompson guided UTSA to the school's first ever NCAA Tournament win, when the Roadrunners defeated Alabama State, by a score of 70–61. On March 10, 2016, Thompson was fired by UTSA, following a 5–27 record.

Personal life and death
In April 2016, Thompson was diagnosed with double organ failure. His condition initially improved from critical to stable, but he had to be rushed to a hospital with sepsis, just days later. He died on June 9, 2016.

Head coaching record

Junior college

College

References

External links
 Basketball-Reference.com: Brooks Thompson
 UTSA Bio

1970 births
2016 deaths
American expatriate basketball people in Greece
American men's basketball coaches
American men's basketball players
Arizona State Sun Devils men's basketball coaches
Basketball coaches from Colorado
Basketball coaches from Texas
Basketball players from Colorado
Basketball players from Dallas
College men's basketball head coaches in the United States
Denver Nuggets players
High school basketball coaches in Oklahoma
High school basketball coaches in the United States
Iraklis Thessaloniki B.C. players
Junior college men's basketball coaches in the United States
New York Knicks players
Oklahoma State Cowboys basketball coaches
Oklahoma State Cowboys basketball players
Orlando Magic draft picks
Orlando Magic players
Phoenix Suns players
Point guards
Southeastern Louisiana Lions basketball coaches
Sportspeople from Dallas
Sportspeople from Littleton, Colorado
Texas A&M Aggies men's basketball players
Utah Jazz players
UTSA Roadrunners men's basketball coaches